Cwmneol Halt railway station co-served the village of Cwmaman, in the historical county of Glamorganshire, Wales, from 1906 to 1932 on the Vale of Neath Railway.

History 
The station was opened to the public on 1 January 1906, although it opened to miners in 1903. It closed on 22 November 1917, although miners continued to use it. It reopened on 7 July 1919 before closing to the public on 22 September 1924. It closed to miners in 1932.

References 

Disused railway stations in Rhondda Cynon Taf
Former Great Western Railway stations
Railway stations in Great Britain opened in 1906
Railway stations in Great Britain closed in 1924
1903 establishments in Wales
1932 disestablishments in Wales